Baron Arthur Grumiaux (21 March 1921 – 16 October 1986) was a Belgian violinist, considered by some to have been "one of the few truly great violin virtuosi of the twentieth century". He has been noted for having a "consistently beautiful tone and flawless intonation". English music critic and broadcaster, Edward Greenfield wrote of him that he was "a master virtuoso who consistently refused to make a show of his technical prowess".

Early life
Born to a working-class family in the Belgian town of Villers-Perwin, on 21 March 1921, Grumiaux was only three years old when his grandfather urged him to begin music studies.  He entered the conservatoire in Charleroi at the age of six; the normal entry age was eleven.  He studied violin and piano there until the age of eleven, when he graduated and moved to the Royal Conservatoire in Brussels to study violin.

Career

He variously has been described as having made his debut in Brussels at the age of 14, or in 1935, although his debut is more commonly said to have occurred in 1940. This performance was made in Belgium with the Brussels Philharmonic playing Mendelssohn's Violin Concerto.

Due to the German invasion of his homeland, he next played publicly after liberation in 1945 with the Allied military entertainment organisation, making his London debut later that year. In 1949 he was appointed professor of violin at the Brussels Conservatoire where he had once studied. He debuted in the United States in Boston in 1951, and toured the United States in the following year.

In 1973 he was created a baron by King Baudouin of Belgium for his services to music.

Death
He died of a sudden stroke in Brussels (Belgium) in 1986 at the age of 65.

Recordings
Grumiaux had a long-standing relationship with Philips Records, lasting more than 20 years, and recordings are available from them of him performing works by Handel, Bach, Vivaldi, Michael Haydn, Mozart, Beethoven, Schubert, Mendelssohn, Bruch, Tchaikovsky, Saint-Saëns, Lalo, Henryk Wieniawski, and Johan Svendsen.

A recording of Grumiaux's performance of one movement from Bach's Sonatas & Partitas for Unaccompanied Violin, the "Gavotte en rondeaux" from the Partita No. 3, is included on the Voyager Golden Record, attached to the Voyager spacecraft, as a sample of the culture of Earth. This recording was chosen by renowned scientist Carl Sagan.

His violins
He owned a Guarneri, the "Rose", made by Giuseppe Guarneri in 1744, and played (but did not own) a Stradivarius, the "General Dupont", made in 1727. He also owned the "Museum", made by Giuseppe Guarneri in 1739, and the "Campoli", made by Giovanni Guadagnini in 1773.

Violin Competition

The International Arthur Grumiaux Competition for Young Violinists is held annually and takes place at the Royal Conservatory of Brussels in Belgium. It was first held in 2008 under the name of "Bravo", In 2015, the competition was renamed in honour of Arthur Grumiaux, and is now called Concours International Arthur Grumiaux pour Jeunes Violonistes (International Arthur Grumiaux Competition for Young Violinists).

References

Further reading
 Arthur Grumiaux on Violin Channel
 2018 finalists on Violin Channel
 2018 prizes of Grumiaux Competition on Violin Channel
 Article and video on Canal C
 Un prestigieux concours international pour jeunes violonistes a lieu à Namur on RTBF website, Sonia Boulanger
 Grumiaux competition on lavenir.net
 Article in Turkish
 Grumiaux competition on crescendo-magazine.be

External links
 The way they played: Arthur Grumiaux, The Strad
 Bach's Chaconne on film: Arthur Grumiaux, The Strad
 Competition site, Arthur Grumiaux Violin Competition

Arthur Grumiaux Discography

1921 births
1986 deaths
Belgian classical violinists
Male classical violinists
Barons of Belgium
Royal Conservatory of Brussels alumni
Academic staff of the Royal Conservatory of Brussels
People from Hainaut (province)
20th-century classical violinists
20th-century Belgian male musicians